Generalganj (Assembly constituency) was a legislative assembly of Uttar Pradesh. As a consequence of the orders of the Delimitation Commission, Generalganj (Assembly constituency) ceased to exist in 2012.

Member of Legislative Assembly

Election results

See also
 List of Vidhan Sabha constituencies of Uttar Pradesh

Former assembly constituencies of Uttar Pradesh
Kanpur Nagar district